The 2021 World RX of Germany was the eighth and ninth round of the eighth season of the FIA World Rallycross Championship. The event was second of two double-headers (two races in a weekend) of the season and held at the Nürburgring, Nürburg.

World RX1 Championship Race 1 

Source

Heats 

 Note: Qualifying was shortened to just two rounds due to a combination of delays for track preparation in the icy and snowy conditions, and a stoppage after a hefty crash for ‘Knapick’ in Q1.

Semi-finals 

 Semi-Final 1

 Semi-Final 2

Final 

Note: Timmy Hansen (originally finished second) and Enzo Ide (did not finish) have been disqualified from the Final following their involvement in a lap one incident that took Niclas Grönholm out of victory contention.

World RX1 Championship Race 2 

Source

Heats

Semi-finals 

 Semi-Final 1

 Semi-Final 2

Final

Standings after the event 

Source

 Note: Only the top six positions are included.

References 

|- style="text-align:center"
|width="35%"|Previous race:2021 World RX of Montalegre
|width="40%"|FIA World Rallycross Championship2021 season
|width="35%"|Next race:2022 World RX of Norway
|- style="text-align:center"
|width="35%"|Previous race:2018 World RX of Germany
|width="40%"|World RX of Germany
|width="35%"|Next race:2022 World RX of Germany
|- style="text-align:center"

Germany
World RX
World RX